Scot McKnight (born November 9, 1953) is an American New Testament scholar, historian of early Christianity, theologian, and author who has written widely on the historical Jesus, early Christianity and Christian living.  He is currently Professor of New Testament at Northern Baptist Theological Seminary in Lisle, IL. McKnight is an ordained Anglican with anabaptist leanings, and has also written frequently on issues in modern anabaptism.

Childhood and education
McKnight was raised in Freeport, Illinois. He earned a B.A. from Grand Rapids Baptist College (now known as Cornerstone University), an M.A. from Trinity Evangelical Divinity School, and, in 1986, a PhD from the University of Nottingham, where he studied under James Dunn, who is known for his work on the New Perspective on Paul.

Career
McKnight was the Karl A. Olsson Professor in Religious Studies at North Park University from 1994 to 2012. Prior to joining the NPU faculty in 1994, he was a professor of New Testament at Trinity Evangelical Divinity School.

McKnight is a prolific author, and has written more than fifty books. One of his most popular books, The Jesus Creed, won the Christianity Today book award for 2004 in the area of Christian living, and has spawned a number of popular small group studies and a DVD series.

McKnight's blog, Jesus Creed (formerly hosted by Beliefnet and now by Patheos) is currently one of the most popular Evangelical blogs online.

McKnight is a popular author and speaker on issues related to the emerging church; his blog was named the most popular blog online related to the movement. He has supported many of the movement's aims. In recent years, however, he has expressed concern about the direction of the movement, particularly regarding the "emergent" stream within the emerging church and some of the work of Brian McLaren.  McKnight and California pastor Dan Kimball more or less officially broke with the emerging movement, and have since formed ReGeneration, an initiative that focuses on ministry to and with young adults.

McKnight has lectured in numerous countries, including Canada, South Korea, Australia, New Zealand, South Africa, Denmark, England, and Ireland. He has also been identified with the New Perspective on Paul.

In April 2014 McKnight announced that he had joined the Anglican Church in North America (ACNA), a denomination founded by former members of the Episcopal Church of the United States. On April 26, 2014 he was ordained into Anglican Holy Orders as a Deacon at Church of the Redeemer in Highwood, Illinois. In January 2017, McKnight began a series of posts explaining more about his transition into the Anglican tradition. He emphasized how much the church calendar was key in his decision to become Anglican, and included screen shots from Robert Webber's 2004 book Ancient Future Time: Forming Spirituality through the Christian Year.

Personal life
McKnight and his wife, Kristen, a psychologist, live in Libertyville, Illinois and have two grown children.
He and his daughter, Laura Barringer, coauthored the children's version of The Jesus Creed, called Sharing God's Love: The Jesus Creed for Children (2014). His son, Lukas McKnight, was a minor league catcher in the Chicago Cubs system, and was part of the Cubs' front office during the 2016 World Series championship.

Works

Books

Chapters

Articles

References

External links
 Jesus Creed—Scot McKnight's personal blog
 Indepth Interview with Scot McKnight -- "Beyond Evangelical"
 Scot McKnight biography from Theopedia
 North Park University
 A Review of McKnight's FASTING
 Review of McKnight's The Blue Parakeet
 Off The Map Episode 4 Scot McKnight Talk from Missional Matrix in 2007

1953 births
American Christian theologians
American biblical scholars
Critics of the Christ myth theory
New Testament scholars
Trinity Evangelical Divinity School alumni
Alumni of the University of Nottingham
Living people
Christian bloggers
People from Freeport, Illinois
Cornerstone University alumni
American Anglican Church in North America members